Chug may refer to:

A crossbreed between a chihuahua dog and a pug
A language of India - see Lish language
CHUG (AM), a community radio station in Stephenville, Newfoundland and Labrador, Canada